1958 college football season may refer to:

 1958 NCAA University Division football season
 1958 NCAA College Division football season
 1958 NAIA football season